Louis Otho (Otto) Williams (1908-1991) was a botanist from Wyoming. He received his BA and MA from the University of Wyoming then a PhD from Washington University in St. Louis. He went on to be editor of the American Orchid Society Bulletin. While he was editor the bulletin increased publication frequency from quarterly to monthly and membership in the society grew from 200 to 3,000. During World War II worked in Brazil on the rubber procurement project. For much of the 1950s he lived in Honduras and started the journal Ceiba there. After returning to the US he worked for the Field Museum of Natural History starting in 1960 and from 1964 to 1973 served as departmental chair.

See also 
 Cryosophila williamsii
 Williams Conservatory

References 

People associated with the Field Museum of Natural History
University of Wyoming alumni
Washington University in St. Louis alumni
American botanists
1908 births
1991 deaths